Sir Edward Evan Evans-Pritchard FBA FRAI (21 September 1902 – 11 September 1973) was an English anthropologist who was instrumental in the development of social anthropology. He was Professor of Social Anthropology at the University of Oxford from 1946 to 1970.

Education and field work
Evans-Pritchard was educated at Winchester College and studied history at Exeter College, Oxford, where he was influenced by R. R. Marett, and then as a postgraduate at the London School of Economics (LSE). His doctoral thesis (1928) was titled "The social organization of the Azande of the Bahr-el-Ghazal province of the Anglo-Egyptian Sudan". 

At Oxford, he was part of the Hypocrites' Club. At LSE, he came under the influence of Bronisław Malinowski and especially Charles Gabriel Seligman, the founding ethnographer of the Sudan. His first fieldwork began in 1926 with the Azande, a people of the upper Nile, and resulted in both a doctorate (in 1927) and his classic Witchcraft, Oracles and Magic Among the Azande (in 1937). Evans-Pritchard continued to lecture at the LSE and conduct research in Azande and Bongo land until 1930, when he began a new research project among the Nuer.

This work coincided with his appointment to the University of Cairo in 1932, where he gave a series of lectures on religion that bore Seligman's influence. After his return to Oxford, he continued his research on Nuer. It was during this period that he first met Meyer Fortes and A. R. Radcliffe-Brown. Evans-Pritchard began developing Radcliffe-Brown's program of structural-functionalism. As a result, his trilogy of works on the Nuer (The Nuer, Nuer Religion, and Kinship and Marriage Among the Nuer) and the volume he coedited entitled African Political Systems came to be seen as classics of British social anthropology. Evans-Pritchard's Witchcraft, Oracles and Magic Among the Azande is the first major anthropological contribution to the sociology of knowledge through its neutral — some would say "relativist" — stance on the "correctness" of Zande beliefs about causation. His work focused in on a known psychological effect known as psychological attribution. Evans-Pritchard recorded the tendencies of Azandes to blame or attribute witchcraft as the cause of various mis-happenings. The most notable of these issues involved the deaths of eight Azande people due to the collapse of a termite infested door frame. Evans-Pritchard's empirical work in this vein became well-known through philosophy of science and "rationality" debates of the 1960s and 1970s involving Thomas Kuhn and especially Paul Feyerabend.

During the Second World War Evans-Pritchard served in Ethiopia, Libya, Sudan, and Syria. In Sudan he raised irregular troops among the Anuak to harass the Italians and engaged in guerrilla warfare. In 1942, he was posted to the British Military Administration of Cyrenaica in North Africa, and it was on the basis of his experience there that he produced The Sanusi of Cyrenaica. In documenting local resistance to Italian conquest, he became one of a few English-language authors to write about the tariqa.

After a brief stint in Cambridge, Evans-Pritchard became professor of social anthropology at the University of Oxford and a Fellow of All Souls College. He remained at All Souls College for the rest of his career. Among the doctoral students he advised was the late M. N. Srinivas, the doyen among India's sociologists who coined some of the key concepts in Indian sociological discourse, including "Sanskritization", "dominant caste" and "vote bank." One of his students was Talal Asad, who now teaches at the City University of New York. Mary Douglas's classic Purity and Danger on pollutions and uncertainty — what we often denote as 'risk' — was fundamentally influenced by Evans-Pritchard's views on how accusations, blame and responsibility are deployed though culturally specific conceptions of misfortune and harm.

Later theories
Evans-Pritchard's later work was more theoretical, drawing upon his experiences as an anthropologist to philosophize on the nature of anthropology and how it should best be practiced. In 1950, he famously disavowed the commonly held view that anthropology was a natural science, arguing instead that it should be grouped amongst the humanities, especially history. He argued that the main issue facing anthropologists was one of translation—finding a way to translate one's own thoughts into the world of another culture and thus manage to come to understand it, and then to translate this understanding back so as to explain it to people of one's own culture.

In 1965, he published the highly influential work Theories of Primitive Religion, arguing against the existing theories of what at the time were called "primitive" religious practices. Arguing along the lines of his theoretical work of the 1950s, he claimed that anthropologists rarely succeeded in entering the minds of the people they studied, and so ascribed to them motivations which more closely matched themselves and their own culture, not the one they were studying. He also argued that believers and non-believers approached the study of religion in vastly different ways, with non-believers being quicker to come up with biological, sociological, or psychological theories to explain religion as an illusion, and believers being more likely to come up with theories explaining religion as a method of conceptualizing and relating to reality.

Life and family
Edward Evan Evans-Pritchard was born in Crowborough, East Sussex, England, the son of an Anglican clergyman. He converted to Roman Catholicism in 1944.

Known to his friends and family as "EP", Evans-Pritchard had five children with his wife Ioma.

Evans-Pritchard died in Oxford on 11 September 1973.

Honours
A Rivers Memorial Medal recipient (1937) and of the Huxley Memorial Medal (1963) he was President of the Royal Anthropological Institute of Great Britain and Ireland from 1949–51. He was elected to the American Academy of Arts and Sciences in 1958 and the American Philosophical Society in 1968. Evans-Pritchard was knighted in 1971. A number of Festschriften were prepared for him:
Essays in Sudan Ethnography: presented to Sir Edward Evans-Pritchard
The Translation of Culture: Essays to E. E. Evans-Pritchard (London: Tavistock, 1973)
Studies in Social Anthropology: Essays in Memory of E. E. Evans-Pritchard by His Former Oxford Colleagues (eds. J. H. M. Beattie and R. G. Lienhardt; Oxford: Clarendon Press, 1975)

Gallery

Bibliography
 1937 Witchcraft, Oracles and Magic Among the Azande. Oxford University Press. 1976 abridged edition: 
 1940a The Nuer: A Description of the Modes of Livelihood and Political Institutions of a Nilotic People. Oxford: Clarendon Press.
 1940b "The Nuer of the Southern Sudan". in African Political Systems. M. Fortes and E.E. Evans-Pritchard, eds., London: Oxford University Press., pp. 272–296.
 1949 The Sanusi of Cyrenaica. London: Oxford: Oxford University Press.
 1951a Kinship and Marriage Among the Nuer. Oxford: Clarendon Press.
 1951b "Kinship and Local Community among the Nuer". in African Systems of Kinship and Marriage. A.R. Radcliffe-Brown and D. Forde, eds., London: Oxford University Press. p. 360–391.
 
 1956 Nuer Religion. Oxford: Clarendon Press.
 1962 Social Anthropology and Other Essays. New York: The Free Press. BBC Third Programme Lectures, 1950.
 1965 Theories of Primitive Religion. Oxford University Press. 
 1967 The Zande Trickster. Oxford: Clarendon Press.
 1971 La femme dans les societés primitives et autres essais d'anthropologie sociale. Paris: Presses Universitaires de France.

References

Further reading
 Mary Douglas (1981). Edward Evans-Pritchard. Kingsport: Penguin Books.

External links
 Photography by Evans-Pritchard in the Southern Sudan, held at the Pitt Rivers Museum collection
 "The scope of the subject", first chapter of Social Anthropology and Other Essays

1902 births
1973 deaths
People from Crowborough
Social anthropologists
British anthropologists
Alumni of Exeter College, Oxford
Alumni of the London School of Economics
Converts to Roman Catholicism from Anglicanism
English Roman Catholics
English people of Welsh descent
Academics of the London School of Economics
Fellows of All Souls College, Oxford
Anthropologists of religion
Evans-Pritchard, E.E.
People educated at Winchester College
Fellows of the British Academy
Fellows of the Royal Anthropological Institute of Great Britain and Ireland
Presidents of the Royal Anthropological Institute of Great Britain and Ireland
20th-century anthropologists
Members of the American Philosophical Society
Expatriate photographers in Sudan